Bredbyn is a locality situated in Örnsköldsvik Municipality, Västernorrland County, Sweden with 1,186 inhabitants in 2010.

Sports
The following sports clubs are located in Bredbyn:

 Anundsjö IF

References 

Populated places in Örnsköldsvik Municipality
Ångermanland